The events of 2011 in anime.

Year in review 
Anime News Network's summarized the biggest events in the year in the industry as Aniplex's business plan. Theron Martin proposed this change in model to be alienating fans and predicted that it could cause backlash for the company. Carl Kimlinger highlighted the 2011 Tōhoku earthquake and tsunami. The destruction caused by the earthquake and following tsunami disrupted and damaged a large portion of Japan, making it the most costly natural disaster in history. The Ishinomori Manga Museum was damaged and would re-open in late 2012, a year and a half after the disaster. Home video sales of anime DVDs in Japan between December 27, 2010 and June 26, 2011 were worth 19.6 billion yen, representing 18.8 of the DVD market; sales of Blu-ray Discs in the same period were worth 17.1 billion yen, representing 57% of the Blu-ray Disc market.

Awards and praise 
The Tokyo Anime Award for best movie was awarded to From Up on Poppy Hill, the award for best television series was given to Puella Magi Madoka Magica and Tiger & Bunny. The OVA award was given to Mobile Suit Gundam UC. Puella Magi Madoka Magica has won numerous awards in 2011, including Japan Media Arts Festival Grand Prize in the Animation Division, the second television program to win that award.

At the Mainichi Film Awards, the Animation Film Award was won by Hotarubi no Mori e and the Ōfuji Noburō Award by 663114. From Up on Poppy Hill won the Japan Academy Prize for Animation of the Year. Internationally, Children Who Chase Lost Voices was nominated for the Asia Pacific Screen Award for Best Animated Feature Film.

Anime News Network's editor picks, the two series of the year were Angel Beats! and Bunny Drop with Hana-Saku Iroha and Cross Game as runners-up. The two picks for movie of the year were Summer Wars and Evangelion: 2.22.

Releases

Films 
A list of anime films that debuted in theaters between 1 January and 31 December 2011.

OVAs & Specials 
A list of original video animations (OVAs), original net animations (ONAs), original animation DVDs (OADs), and specials released between 1 January and 31 December 2011. Titles listed are named after their series if their associated OVA, special, etc. was not named separately.

Television series 
A list of anime television series released between 1 January and 31 December 2011.

Deaths
 April 17 - Osamu Dezaki, film director, screenwriter
 July 23 - Toyoo Ashida, director, character designer, animator, animation director, screenwriter

See also 

2011 in animation

Notes

References

External links 
Japanese animated works of the year, listed in the IMDb

Years in anime
2011 in animation
2011 in Japan